The Onversaagd class was a ship class of six minesweepers that were built in the United States for the Royal Netherlands Navy (RNN). They were paid for by the United States under the Mutual Defense Assistance Program (MDAP).

Design 
To sweep naval mines the minesweepers of the Onversaagd class were equipped with the Wire Mk1, M Mk 6 A, A Mk 6B and the A Mk 4v. Furthermore, the ships had a single 40 mm gun. In addition, the minesweepers were equipped with a prototype of the UQS-1, but this mine avoidance sonar did not meet expectations.

Ships in class 

 ¹ = later rebuild as hydrographic survey vessel
 ² = later rebuild as mine clearance support vessel
 ³ = later rebuild as Submarine support vessel

Citations

References 

Onversaagd-class minesweepers
Mine warfare vessel classes